Aluminium is the name of a music project based upon an orchestral reworking of the music of the band The White Stripes. Its members are Richard Russell and Joby Talbot. Jack White, of the White Stripes, has endorsed the project.

Rob Jones has also produced an exhibition of artwork based on the album.

Artwork
Ten images based upon the album, as well as a series of other White Stripes and Raconteurs artwork, all by Rob Jones, were displayed at the Richard Goodall Gallery in Manchester in Autumn 2006. In the 999 LP editions of the album there are 10 inch square sections of a silk print by Rob Jones in each sleeve.

Album
The album, of orchestral music, was originally conceived by Richard Russell and Joby Talbot. After working on some tracks - including "Aluminium" (the White Stripes' original from the album White Blood Cells retained the American spelling "Aluminum") and "I'm Bound to Pack it Up" - they presented the work to the White Stripes in Cincinnati.

Following White's penchant for the number "3", only 3,333 copies of the CD version have been produced, along with 999 LPs. In addition to this, the album is available on unlimited download. The album was available for pre-order on November 6, 2006 and fully released on November 13.

The music was recorded by a specially selected orchestra. Part of it has since been used in the ballet Chroma, choreographed by Wayne McGregor for The Royal Ballet.

Track listing

Single

On November 13, 2006, XL Recordings released a 12" vinyl only single from the Aluminium album, limited to 500 copies. Side A was the track "Aluminum", while B contained a remix by Four Tet of "Forever For Her (Is Over For Me)". The catalogue number for the single was XLT 246. Rob Jones designed the sleeve art, similar in appearance to the Aluminium album cover.

References

External links
 Official site for The White Stripes

The White Stripes
XL Recordings albums
2006 albums